Dialakoroba  is a village and rural commune in the Cercle of Kati in the Koulikoro Region of south-western Mali. The commune contains 24 villages and in the 2009 census had a population of 22,907. The village of Dialakoroba lies on the Route Nationale 7 (RN7) 50 km south of Bamako, the Malian capital.

References

External links
.

Communes of Koulikoro Region